Beautiful People are a British techno-dance group. Having been granted permission to sample any Jimi Hendrix song they wished, they released "If 60's Was 90's". Originally released in 1992 in just the United Kingdom, a similarly named album, If 60's Were 90's, was also issued. In 1993, they released "Rilly Groovy", which reached No. 3 in the United States Billboard Hot Dance Club Songs chart; on the back of this, "If 60's Was 90's" was re-released and peaked at No. 74 on the UK Singles Chart, and No. 5 on the Hot Dance Club Songs chart.

In 2012, Beautiful People had a No. 100 hit in the UK with a pre-release cover version of "Turn Up the Music" by Chris Brown.

References

Tribute bands
Jimi Hendrix
Cover bands